Microbotryum is a genus of fungi found in the family Microbotryaceae. It contains 89 species.

Species

Microbotryum adenopetalae
Microbotryum afromontanum
Microbotryum ahmadianum
Microbotryum alsines
Microbotryum anomalum
Microbotryum arenariae-bryophyllae
Microbotryum aviculare
Microbotryum bardanense
Microbotryum betonicae
Microbotryum bistortarum
Microbotryum bosniacum
Microbotryum calandriniae
Microbotryum calandriniicola
Microbotryum calyptratae
Microbotryum cardui
Microbotryum carthusianorum
Microbotryum cephalariae
Microbotryum chloranthae-verrucosum
Microbotryum cichorii
Microbotryum cilinode
Microbotryum claytoniae
Microbotryum cordae
Microbotryum coronariae
Microbotryum coronatum
Microbotryum dehiscens
Microbotryum dianthorum
Microbotryum dumosum
Microbotryum duriaeanum
Microbotryum emodensis
Microbotryum filamenticola
Microbotryum flosculorum
Microbotryum gaussenii
Microbotryum gayophyti
Microbotryum goeppertianum
Microbotryum himalense
Microbotryum holostei
Microbotryum intermedium
Microbotryum jehudanum
Microbotryum koenigiae
Microbotryum kuehneanum
Microbotryum lagerheimii
Microbotryum lewisiae
Microbotryum longisetum
Microbotryum lychnidis-dioicae
Microbotryum major
Microbotryum marginale
Microbotryum minuartiae
Microbotryum moehringiae
Microbotryum moelleri
Microbotryum moenchiae-manticae
Microbotryum montagnei
Microbotryum morinae
Microbotryum nannfeldtii
Microbotryum nelsonianum
Microbotryum nepalense
Microbotryum nivale
Microbotryum ocrearum
Microbotryum onopordi
Microbotryum parlatorei
Microbotryum paucireticulatum
Microbotryum perfoliatae
Microbotryum picaceum
Microbotryum pinguiculae
Microbotryum piperi
Microbotryum polygoni-alati
Microbotryum primulae
Microbotryum prostratum
Microbotryum pustulatum
Microbotryum radians
Microbotryum receptaculorum
Microbotryum reticulatum
Microbotryum rhei
Microbotryum salviae
Microbotryum saponariae
Microbotryum savilei
Microbotryum scabiosae
Microbotryum scolymi
Microbotryum scorzonerae
Microbotryum shastense
Microbotryum shykoffianum
Microbotryum silenes-acaulis
Microbotryum silenes-dioicae
Microbotryum silenes-inflatae
Microbotryum silybum
Microbotryum stellariae
Microbotryum stewartii
Microbotryum stygium
Microbotryum succisae
Microbotryum superbum
Microbotryum tenuisporum
Microbotryum tovarae
Microbotryum tragopogonis-pratensis
Microbotryum tuberculiforme
Microbotryum tumeforme
Microbotryum vinosum
Microbotryum violaceoirregulare
Microbotryum violaceoverrucosum
Microbotryum violaceum
Microbotryum warmingii

References

External links

Basidiomycota genera
Microbotryales
Taxa named by Joseph-Henri Léveillé
Taxa described in 1847